Héctor Rodríguez may refer to:

, Uruguayan politician
Héctor Rodríguez (baseball) (1920–2003), Major League Baseball third baseman
Héctor Rodríguez (basketball) (born 1952), Mexican Olympic basketball player
Héctor Rodríguez (equestrian) (born 1936), Colombian Olympic equestrian
Héctor Rodríguez (judoka) (born 1951), Cuban judoka
Héctor Rodríguez Castro, (born 1982) Venezuelan politician
Héctor Rodríguez (footballer) (born 1968), Uruguayan footballer
Héctor Francisco Rodríguez (born 1982), Honduran football referee
Héctor Moreira Rodríguez, cabinet member under Mexican president Vicente Fox

See also 
 Rodríguez (surname)